The Senigaglia family (sometimes spelt Sinigaglia) is an Italian Jewish family, whose origins can be traced back nearly 800 years, the period between the High Middle Age and the Renaissance.

Origins

Possible Spanish origin
One theory claims a Spanish origin, forming the hypothesis that they fled Spain because of the Inquisition. However, 22 years before 1492 (year of the Spanish expulsion), they were already settled in Italy, probably at Senigallia. Apart from the date problem, it seems difficult to believe that families running away from the Holy Inquisition and the Vatican, end up in a town run practically by the pope himself; whether it was Pope Alexander VI from the Borgia family, of Spanish origins, or Julius II from the Della Rovere family.

Possible Roman origin
Another theory claims a Roman origin. If the family came from Rome, they probably fled the city after 1215, when a Roman Catholic Church council, convened by Pope Innocent III, passed a law that authorized and encouraged princes to forbid all commerce between Jews and the Christian majority, and to favor Christians while being “zealous in restraining Jews.” The law also demanded that Jews who had ever acquired property from Christians must pay heavy fines to the church. The pope was both the head of the church and the direct ruler of Rome and the surrounding Papal States. 

During the subsequent centuries a number of Roman Jewish families left Rome on their own, or were encouraged by the Church to go to different towns or villages to establish small usury banks (with the purpose to substitute Christians in that line of business). They traveled choosing the Via Salaria or the Via Flaminia, taking along with them their tradesman abilities (with the corresponding family names, respectively): Orefice, Tessitori, Tintori, Della Seta (Goldsmith, Weaver, Dyer, Silk).

Other possible origins

Other possible origins are mixed in the melting pot of those troubled years:
 Ashkenazi Jews came from German-speaking countries, after the 1348 black plague (that Jewish communities have been accused of spreading, and for which many have been burnt alive). The individuals and families lucky enough to have survived moved to Venice and to Ancona, probably because the proximity of water made them safer.
 Sephardic Jews (the word derives from "Spain", Sepharad in Hebrew), expelled from Spain in 1492, started a long migration through Portugal and Northern Europe arriving at Livorno and later in the 16th century reaching the Marche.

Arrival in Senigallia

Chronology of Senigallia
 1306: The town was conquered by Pandolfo Malatesta
 1355-57: ownership returned to the Vatican with the help of cardinal Albornoz
 1445: Popes Eugene IV and Nicholas V confirmed the ownership as vicariate to Sigismondo Pandolfo Malatesta
 1459: direct ownership of the Church due to a debt of Malatesta
 1462: Malatesta tried to reconquer the town but he was defeated in the battle of the Cesano by Federico from Montefeltro
 1462-64: ruled by Antonio Piccolomini, then back to the Church
 1474: given by Pope Sixtus IV to his nephew Giovanni della Rovere who became Lord of Senigallia and of the Vicariate of Mondavio. It belonged to the same family until 1631. Decrees against the Jews.
 1493: Giovanni Della Rovere founded the Fair of San Francesco
 March 1502: Pope Alexander VI confirmed the investiture to the twelve-year-old heir of Giovanni, Francesco Maria I Della Rovere
 31 December 1502: Cesare Borgia, Duke of  Valentinois,  invaded Senigallia
 31 October 1503: Cardinal Giuliano Della Rovere was elected Pope as Julius II: Cesare Borgia was imprisoned and Francesco Maria I obtained back the control of the town. (Imposition of the yellow badge to the Jews)

As a consequence of the marginalization of the Jewish community, many Jewish families left Rome in the 13th, 14th and 15th centuries to reach villages and towns in the Marche. A non exhaustive list includes: Ancona, Ascoli, Barchi, Belforte, Cagli, Camerino, Cingoli, Corinaldo, Fano, Jesi, Macerata, Mondolfo, Mombaroccio, Montefiore, Osimo, Pergola, Perugia, Pesaro, Recanati, Rimini, Tolentino and Urbino.

The three branches

Among those families, Leucius brought his group to Senigallia and settled down there. Leucius was probably born around 1380 CE and it is unclear when he moved from Rome to his new town.
At the end of the fifteenth century, the family moved out of Senigallia looking for places where their life could be considered less dangerous.

 
One group moved to Mantua (Daniel and Isac da Senigallia, bankers at la Volta Mantovana) and another led by a H'anna'el Graziadio moved firstly to Modena and later to Scandiano, a small village at that time, not far from Modena, under the ownership of the Duke of Ferrara.

They restarted their banking activities and slowly built themselves a favourable situation, including a house, a school and a Synagogue. In 1656 they sold everything to the Almansi family, who came to Scandiano from Spain and the Senigaglia left Scandiano.

From this moment the family divides in three branches: 
 The first one goes back to Modena and then eventually return to Senigallia. They also changed their name to Sinigaglia from the previous Senigaglia.
 The second branch ended in Lugo: they became rich merchants and famous goldsmiths. They also changed their name into Sinigaglia
 The third, led by a Baruch (Benedetto) Senigaglia established themselves in Gorizia a small beautiful town 40 kilometres north of Trieste

Genealogy

Crests

Two family crests are known:

Notable individuals
 Oscar Sinigaglia. Founder of the Italian steel industry
 Leone Sinigaglia, Italian composer.
 Giuseppe Sinigaglia was the head of KKL in Italy.

See also
 History of the Jews in Italy

References

External links
 http://www.racine.ra.it/curba/_static/materialeStud/ebrei/sinigalia.htm
 website of Jonathan Senigaglia
 Giuseppe Tominz, portrait of the Sinigaglia family, 1845

Jewish-Italian families
Sephardic surnames